Marvak (also Romanized as Marūk and Morvak) is a village in Silakhor Rural District, Silakhor District, Dorud County, Lorestan Province, Iran. At the 2006 census, its population was 203, in 53 families.

References 

Towns and villages in Dorud County